The 1984 FA Trophy Final was the 15th final of the FA Trophy, the Football Association's cup competition for non-League teams.

The final was contested between Northwich Victoria and Bangor City. Northwich were beaten finalists a year earlier, but it was Bangor's first final. This was the first meeting of the two sides in a major cup final since the 1889 Welsh Cup Final.

The match at Wembley Stadium ended in a 1–1 draw, so a reply was played at Stoke City's Victoria Ground. Northwich Victoria won the replay 2–1.

Final

Replay

Fa Trophy Final 1984
Fa Trophy Final 1984
FA Trophy Finals
Fa Trophy Final
Tro
Tro
FA Trophy Final
Events at Wembley Stadium
FA Trophy Final